St. Gabriel the Archangel is one of the churches of Rome, located in the suburbs Della Vittoria, Viale Cortina d'Ampezzo.

History

It was built in the twentieth century.
The church is home to the parish, which was established August 30, 1956 by Clemente Micara Cardinal Vicar with the decree Neminem fugit, and entrusted, since 1958, the priests of the Society of Divine Vocations (called vocation promoters).

List of Cardinal Protectors
It also is home to the cardinal's title of Saint Gabriel the Archangel Acqua Travers, instituted by Pope John Paul II on 28 June 1988.

 Jean Margeot (28 June 1988 - 17 July 2009)
 José Manuel Estepa Llaurens (20 November 2010 – 21 July 2019)
 Fridolin Ambongo Besungu (5 October 2019 – present)

References
 San Gabriel Arcangelo

Titular churches
Rome Q. XV Della Vittoria
Roman Catholic churches completed in 1958
20th-century Roman Catholic church buildings in Italy